This is a List of public administration journals presenting representative academic journals in the field of public administration.

A 
American Review of Public Administration
Administration and Society

G 
Governance

I 
International Review of Administrative Sciences

J 
Journal of Public Administration Research and Theory
Journal of Public Affairs Education
Journal of Urban Affairs

N 
National Civic Review
National Tax Journal
Nonprofit and Voluntary Sector Quarterly

P 
Policy Sciences
Policy Studies Journal
Public Administration
Public Administration and Development
Public Administration Review
Public Budgeting and Finance
Public Performance and Management Review
Public Personnel Management
Public Policy and Administration
Publius: The Journal of Federalism
Public Works Management and Policy

R 
Review of Policy Research
Review of Public Personnel Administration

S 
State and Local Government Review

T 
Teaching Public Administration

U 
Urban Affairs Review

V 
Voluntas

Public administration journals
Public administration